Scunthorpe is a constituency represented in the House of Commons of the UK Parliament since 2019 by Holly Mumby-Croft, a member of the Conservative Party, when she gained the seat from the Labour Party.

Boundaries

1997–2010: The Borough of Scunthorpe, and the Borough of Glanford wards of Bottesford Central, Bottesford East, Bottesford West, Kirton, Messingham, and South Ancholme.

2010–present: The Borough of North Lincolnshire wards of Ashby, Bottesford, Brumby, Crosby and Park, Frodingham, Kingsway with Lincoln Gardens, Ridge, and Town.

The constituency includes the whole of Scunthorpe, Bottesford, Yaddlethorpe, Messingham, Manton, Kirton-in-Lindsey, Redbourne, Hibaldstow, Cadney and the hamlets and communities within these parishes.

History
Although there was talk in a local newspaper in the 1930s that the town of Scunthorpe should have a parliamentary constituency named after it, it was only after the boundary reviews implemented in 1997 that a constituency of this name was created. Previous incarnations of a constituency containing the steel town and small towns and villages around it had been called (going backwards in time) Glanford and Scunthorpe, Brigg and Scunthorpe, and Brigg.

Constituency profile
Results to date indicate that the constituency has changed since creation from a safe seat for the Labour Party created at the incoming election for Prime Minister Tony Blair to somewhat of a marginal majority area for the party.
In statistics
The constituency consists of Census Output Areas of a local government district with: a working population whose income is below the national average and slightly higher than average reliance upon social housing. At the end of 2012 the unemployment rate in the constituency stood as 5.7% of the population claiming jobseekers allowance, compared to the regional average of 4.7%. The borough contributing to the seat had a middling 20.7% of its population without a car, 26.2% of the population without qualifications and 19.5% with level 4 qualifications or above.  In terms of tenure 69.5% of homes are owned outright or on a mortgage as at the 2011 census across the district.

Members of Parliament
Nic Dakin was elected in the 2010 general election with a lower share of the vote than achieved under the Blair Ministry by his predecessor, with 39.5% of the votes.

Elections

Elections in the 2010s

Elections in the 2000s

Elections in the 1990s

See also 
 List of parliamentary constituencies in Humberside

Notes

References

Parliamentary constituencies in Yorkshire and the Humber
Constituencies of the Parliament of the United Kingdom established in 1997
Borough of North Lincolnshire
Scunthorpe